The Kinnegad River is a river in Kinnegad, County Westmeath, Ireland. The river is a tributary of the River Boyne, meeting it near the town of Clonard, County Meath.

References 

Rivers of County Meath
Rivers of County Westmeath